Seven Pines is an unincorporated community in Marion County, West Virginia, United States. Its post office  is closed.

References 

Unincorporated communities in West Virginia
Unincorporated communities in Marion County, West Virginia